Expressway 5 (E5) forms part of the Philippine expressway network. Collectively known as the  North Luzon Expressway Harbor Link Project (NLEX Harbor Link Project), it runs from Congressional Avenue and Luzon Avenue, both components of Circumferential Road 5, in Quezon City to Radial Road 10 in Navotas, linking the North Luzon Expressway to the Port of Manila. Currently, its segment from Mindanao Avenue in Valenzuela to Navotas is operational.

History 

Construction of NLEX Segment 8.1 (Mindanao Avenue Link), the first segment of the Harbor Link project, broke ground on April 2, 2009, with actual construction work beginning on April 21, 2009. It was then opened on June 5, 2010. The spur road became part of the C-5 Road North Extension and is built to provide another entry point to the expressway from Metro Manila and decongest Balintawak Interchange.

In 2013–2014, the construction of NLEX Segments 9 (Karuhatan Link) and 10 (Harbor Link) broke ground. On March 18, 2015, NLEX Segment 9 was opened, providing continuation to Segment 8.1 that runs from the western side of the Smart Connect Interchange to MacArthur Highway in Karuhatan, Valenzuela.

On February 28, 2019, the main stretch of NLEX Segment 10 from MacArthur Highway to C-3 Road in Caloocan was inaugurated and opened to traffic. However, this section of NLEX Segment 10 was supposed to be operational in December 2016, but was delayed repeatedly due to right of way issues and delayed ROW acquisition. On February 21, 2020, its C-3–R-10 section was partially opened up to its Malabon (Dagat-Dagatan) exit ramp. On June 15, its remaining section up to Radial Road 10 was finally opened. This section was originally expected to open in March 2020, but was delayed due to the COVID-19 pandemic.

Route description 
The NLEX Harbor Link Project is the extension of the North Luzon Expressway that runs currently from Mindanao Avenue in Valenzuela at the east to Radial Road 10 in Navotas at the west, where an access to the Port of Manila is found. It aims to connect with Port of Manila, while improving cargo movement between NLEX and Radial Road 10. It is divided into four segments, namely: Segment 8.1 (Mindanao Avenue Link), 8.2 (C-5 Link / Citi Link), 9 (Karuhatan Link), and 10 (Harbor Link). It forms part of the expressway's open section. Both Segments 8.1 and 9 are components of Circumferential Road 5 (C-5) of Manila's arterial road network.

Mindanao Avenue to NLEX main 

NLEX Segment 8.1 (Mindanao Avenue Link) is a four-lane,  expressway that runs from the Smart Connect Interchange to Mindanao Avenue in Valenzuela. Lying on the ground level east of the interchange, it begins at the intersection with Mindanao Avenue in Barangay Ugong and then approaches the Mindanao toll plazas, widening to 6 lanes serving only westbound traffics. It terminates at the Smart Connect Interchange with NLEX Main and continues to the west as Segment 9 (Karuhatan Link).

NLEX main to Karuhatan 

NLEX Segment 9 (Karuhatan Link) is a four-lane,  expressway that runs from Smart Connect Interchange to MacArthur Highway in Karuhatan, Valenzuela. It is the first segment of the NLEX Harbor Link project. It begins at the Smart Connect Interchange with NLEX Main, picking-up from where Segment 8.1 (Mindanao Avenue Link) left off. Lying on the ground level west of the interchange, it then traverses Barangays Gen. T. De Leon, Parada, and Maysan, where two exits towards the first two barangays, respectively, are found. It then enters Barangay Karuhatan, where it approaches the Karuhatan toll plaza, widening to 6 lanes serving only eastbound vehicles, and Segment 10 (Harbor Link) and finally terminates at MacArthur Highway.

Karuhatan to Navotas 

NLEX Segment 10 (Harbor Link), the second phase of the NLEX Harbor Link project, is a four-lane,  fully elevated expressway which connects with the Karuhatan Link (Segment 9) in Valenzuela to C-3 Road in Caloocan, where two ramps carry it to the west for another  up to Radial Road 10 (R-10) in Navotas. It begins at Karuhatan Exit with Segment 9 (Karuhatan Link) and MacArthur Highway. The section near the northern terminus traverses an industrial and residential area, which necessitated the demolition of numerous houses, buildings, and warehouses. It then crosses Tullahan River, where it enters Malabon. It then enters Caloocan, where past Samson Road and the PNR rolling stock shops in Caloocan, it shifts east of the railway's right of way, which also necessitated the demolition of a wet market. An exit to C-3 Road could then be found before meeting the Caloocan Interchange, where the expressway veers west as the C3–R10 spur alignment with connection to the under-construction NLEX Connector (NLEX-SLEX Connector Road) that would lead southwards to Manila. The  C3–R10 section runs above C-3 Road, where a westbound exit ramp towards Dagat-Dagatan Avenue could be found. It then crosses the Navotas River and enters Navotas, where it veers southeast towards R-10 and ends at the Navotas Interchange, which provides access to the Port of Manila via Mel Lopez Boulevard.

At the Navotas Interchange, the expressway has a possible future connection to the proposed NLEX–CAVITEX Port Expressway Link or Harbor Link Port Access Mobility Facility towards Manila–Cavite Expressway (CAVITEX) or Anda Circle, respectively.

Future

Segment 8.2 (NLEX–C-5 Link) 
NLEX Segment 8.2, also named NLEX C-5 Link and NLEX Citi Link, will be an  segment part of the NLEX Harbor Link Project that will connect the existing NLEX Segment 8.1 (Mindanao Avenue Link) to Katipunan Avenue, a part of C-5. It is divided into two sections: the  Section 1 from Mindanao Avenue to Luzon Avenue and the  Section 2 from Luzon Avenue to C.P. Garcia Avenue. The planned segment will at first run parallel to Republic Avenue before making a southward turn to Luzon Avenue after which it will then cross to Commonwealth Avenue and end at the intersection of C.P. Garcia and Katipunan Avenues. The segment will include five interchanges at Mindanao Avenue, Quirino Highway, Regalado Avenue, Congressional and Luzon Avenues, and Katipunan and C.P. Garcia Avenues, with three local road crossings at Sauyo Road, Chestnut Avenue, and Commonwealth Avenue.

The project implementation has been delayed for years due to right of way issues, as it will affect informal settlers in 8 barangays of Quezon City. Construction of the expressway segment's  Section 1A between Mindanao Avenue and Quirino Highway is set to commence in September 2021.

List in Exits

References 

Toll roads in the Philippines
Roads in Metro Manila